Tracy Beaker Returns is a United Kingdom children's television series, broadcast on CBBC and simultaneously aired on BBC HD. Based on the novels by Jacqueline Wilson, the series focuses on older Tracy Beaker, who returns to the Dumping Ground as a care worker. The first series premiered on 8 January 2010 and ended on 26 March 2010, consisting of 13 episodes. Series two premiered on 7 January 2011 and ended on 25 March 2011, also consisting of 13 episodes. Series three premiered on 6 January 2012 and ended on 23 March 2012, again consisting of 13 episodes. A spin-off series was then commissioned by the CBBC, titled The Dumping Ground, which began airing in 2013.

Series overview

Episodes

Series 1 (2010)

Series 2 (2011)

Series 3 (2012)

Spin off media

Tracy Beaker Survival Files (2011–2012)

A thirteen part series entitled "Tracy Beaker Survival Files" was aired and featured clips from Tracy Beaker Returns and The Story of Tracy Beaker.

References

The Story of Tracy Beaker
Lists of children's television series episodes
Tracy Beaker series